SS Oronsay was the second Orient Line ship built after World War II.

The liner was completed in 1951 at Vickers-Armstrong, Barrow-in-Furness, but was delivered several months behind schedule because of a serious fire that broke out in the fitting-out berth. The Oronsay operated the UK to Australasia service, via the Suez Canal. Her accommodation set new standards, in both first and tourist class, with decor by Brian O'Rourke. 

On 1 January 1954, Oronsay left Sydney on the first Orient Line transpacific voyage to Auckland, Suva, Honolulu, Victoria, Vancouver and San Francisco, returning via the same ports. In later years the transpacific sailings became a regular feature of the Orient/P&O services. 

In 1960 the Orient Line and P&O fleets were merged under the control of P&O-Orient Lines (Passenger Services) Ltd. Oronsay continued to operate under the Orient houseflag and retained her corn-coloured hull until 1964, when her hull was painted P&O white. In 1966, P&O having acquired the balance of the Orient shares (it had controlled Orient since 1919), Orient Line was wound up and Oronsay, along with her fleet mates, was transferred to the ownership of P&O and hoisted the P&O houseflag. 

Liner services were producing dwindling returns as jet airliner services between Europe and Australia expanded and Oronsay spent more and more time as a cruise ship, but, with declining passenger numbers, P&O could not sustain its large passenger fleet, withdrawals beginning in 1972. The large rises in the oil price in 1973/4 were the final straw  and Oronsay was withdrawn from service, the penultimate example of the six post war 28,000 ton types (Arcadia sailed on until 1979). On 7 October 1975 she arrived at Kaohsiung to be broken up by the Nan Feng Steel Enterprise Co.

In popular culture
Oronsay was one of the ships seen in the 1958 British comedy film The Captain's Table. Stock footage of all three post war Orient ships was used to depict the fictional SS Queen Adelaide and some scenes were shot on board at Tilbury Docks. Orient ships were also seen in stock footage in the 1962 British comedy film Carry On Cruising, in which Oronsay depicted the cruise ship SS Happy Wanderer.

The ship is also the primary setting of the novel The Cat's Table (2011) by Michael Ondaatje. The novel tells the story of a boy's three week trip on the Oronsay.

Notable passengers
 Australian writer Leonora Polkinghorne died on board the Oronsay in May 1953, whilst en route to Denmark to attend the Women's World Congress.
 Tony Abbott, the 28th Prime Minister of Australia, emigrated, aged 2, to Australia with his family aboard the Oronsay in 1960.
 British historical novelist Eleanor Hibbert travelled on the Oronsay from United Kingdom to Sydney in 1970.
 Musician David Bowie travelled on the Oronsay from San Francisco to Yokohama in March/April 1973.
 Michael Ondaatje's 2011 novel The Cat's Table is a fictionalised account of the author's childhood voyage in 1954 from Ceylon to Britain on board the Oronsay.
 Lord George Brown the Labour politician was a passenger on a cruise to Las Palmas, Madeira, Bermuda, Jamaica and Trinidad & Tobago in December 1968.
 Andy Gibb, younger brother of Barry, Robin and Maurice Gibb of the Bee Gees, travelled with his parents between Australia and England in early 1969. Oronsay was on a round the world cruise.

References

Ships built in Barrow-in-Furness
Cruise ships
Ships of the Orient Line
Passenger ships of the United Kingdom
1950 ships
Steamships